Jokainen vieras on laulun arvoinen is a Finnish reality TV music television series which aired on Subtv from 5 January to 9 March 2007. Featuring Zarkus Poussa it was broadcast in ten 30 minute episodes, who would compose, write lyrics and record a song for the people.  The program was filmed between May and June 2006.

The program name refers to Veikko Lavi's perhaps best-known song "Jokainen ihminen on laulun arvoinen".

References

External links

2007 Finnish television series debuts
2007 Finnish television series endings
Finnish reality television series
2000s Finnish television series
Sub (TV channel) original programming